Ottavio Ragni was an Italian general. He had been the governor of Tripolitania between (1912–1913).

At the battle of Adwa, during the Italian invasion of Abyssinia, he led the 3rd Infantry Regiment Africa.

At the beginning of World War I he commanded the 1st corps of the 4th Italian army.

Notes

Italian colonial governors and administrators
1852 births
1919 deaths
Italian military personnel of the First Italo-Ethiopian War
Italian military personnel of the Italo-Turkish War
Italian military personnel of World War I
People from the Romagnano Sesia